Pouya Pourjalil (born January 5, 1976, born in Bandar-e Anzali, Iran) is an Iranian pop singer.

Biography
Pourjalil was born on January 5, 1976, in Bandar-e Anzali, a city in northern Iran. He grew up in a family of four. When Pourjalil was only ten years old, his parents and younger sister moved to Norway and lived there for seven years before he moved to London to pursue his love and passion for music.

He lived in London for five years where he started his professional career as a Persian singer. While living in London, Pourjalil attended several classes to enhance his music skills and knowledge. He also performed at various Persian night clubs and concert halls.

At an early age he realized that in order to achieve his goals and dreams as a professional singer, he had to be at a place where the Persian music industry was growing more, with better opportunities, which then later brought him to Los Angeles.

After his arrival in Los Angeles, he started working with the famous entertainment company, Taraneh Enterprises, who were in charge of his album releases, as well as his marketing and advertisement.

His first album was released in 2000 by Taraneh Enterprises. As of February 2020, Pourjalil has published seven albums, working with the most talented Persian songwriters, producers, composers...etc.

He has over 30 music videos, all available to be viewed by his fans all over the world.

His hobbies are shooting, movies, camping, swimming, boxing and cooking.

After touring all around the world for several years, making new music and recording has been his priority for the past two years. He states that his albums are a culmination of many years of experience and offer a new experience for his fans while retaining all the well-loved elements of his past albums.

In 2020, Sasy, an Iranian singer living in the United States, released a video clip titled "Doctor". The video's content sparked many protests in cyberspace. One of the people who severely criticized Sasy was Pouya Pourjalil. He strongly criticized the Iranian singer on his personal Instagram page.

Albums
2000 Ghatreyeh Baran
2003 Gharibaneh
2004 Roya
2008 Tasvir
2014 Tabe Tond
2016 Rabete

Singles
2013 Dari Miri
2014 Tarkam Kon
2016 Bigharar
2016 Ghorse Khab
2017 Fardaye Khoob
2017 Doret Beghardam
2017 Sharab
2018 Boghz
2018 Irane Man (ft. Hamed Fard) 
2018 Mahtab
2019 Adamo Hava
2019 Cheshmaye Naz 
2020 Khoshbakhti 
2020 Kenare Raftanet 
2020 Arezouye Man
2020 Nafas
2020 Bahooneh
2020 Tanhaei
2020 Vay Az To
2021 Bikhiyali

See also
Persian pop music

References

External links

Pouya Pourjalil - Facebook page 
Pouya Pourjalil - Instagram page
Pouya Pourjalili - YouTube channel
Pouya Pourjalil on Apple Music
Pouya Pourjalil on Spotify
Pouya Pourjalil on Amazon Music
Pouya Pourjalil on Shazam
Pouya Pourjalil on Google Music

1976 births
21st-century Iranian male singers
Iranian pop singers
Living people
People from Bandar-e Anzali
Exiles of the Iranian Revolution in the United States
Iranian emigrants to the United Kingdom
Taraneh Records artists